N. japonica may refer to:
 Neadmete japonica, a sea snail species
 Neoshirakia japonica, a plant species found in Japan and East Asian countries
 Nerita japonica, a sea snail species
 Ninox japonica, the Northern boobook, a bird species found in eastern Russia, North Korea, South Korea, northern and central China and Japan
 Nordstromia japonica, a moth species found in Japan and China
 Nuphar japonica, an aquatic plant species found in Japan

See also 
 Japonica (disambiguation)